Sidikhin is a Russian masculine surname, its feminine counterpart is Sidikhina. Notable people with the surname include:

Yevgeny Sidikhin (born 1964), Russian actor, father or Polina

Russian-language surnames